Kypuche, formerly known as Artemovsk / Artemivsk (translit.: Artemivs’k) is a city in the Perevalsk Raion of Luhansk Oblast in eastern Ukraine. Population: , .

The city has been under the control of the Lugansk People's Republic since 2014. 

The city is located some 60k from Bakhmut, which was also formerly known as Artemovsk.

History
The city was founded as Katerynivka village in 1910 close to the railway station of Kypyche (Vigorous). Its name was changed to Artema in 1923 and to Artemivsk in 1938 in honor of Russian revolutionary and Stalinist figure Comrade Artyom.

From 2014 until its annexation by Russia in 2022, the city was occupied by pro-Russian forces of the Luhansk People's Republic.

On May 12, 2016, Ukraine's national parliament, the Verkhovna Rada, decided to restore the name of Kypuche as part of the country's decommunization process. However, the local authorities did not recognize the name change and Russia has continued not to after annexation.

Economy
Its major industry is coal mining. Southeast of Artemivsk.

References

External links
 http://factfinder.census.gov

Cities in Luhansk Oblast
Cities of district significance in Ukraine
Populated places established in the Russian Empire
Populated places established in 1910
City name changes in Ukraine
Soviet toponymy in Ukraine
1910 establishments in Ukraine